Petros Elia of Baz (April 1880 – 2 February 1932), better known as Agha Petros, was an Assyrian military leader during World War I.

Early years 
Petros Elia was from  the Lower Baz village, Ottoman Empire in 1880. There he received his elementary education before attending a European missionary school in the Persian city of Urmia. After finishing his studies, he went back to his village of Baz and became a teacher there. It was thanks to his fluency in numerous languages, including Syriac, Turkish, Arabic, French, Persian, Kurdish, English, and Russian, he was appointed by the Ottomans as a secretary, and as a Consul in Urmia briefly in 1909.

World War I 
After the Russians entered Urmia, Agha Petros was appointed as a general with a small Assyrian force under his command. He later engaged and defeated forces of Ottoman and Kurds in a series of battles. He was later approached by the Allies and was given command of the left wing of the army of Assyrian volunteers (the right wing being commanded by Mar Shimun’s brother Dawid Mar Shimun, the center being under the command of Mar Shimun).

His volunteers had quite a few successes over the Ottoman forces, notably at Suldouze where Petros’ 1,500 horsemen overcame the forces of Kheiri Bey's (8,000 men). Petros also defeated the Ottomans in a major engagement at Sauj Bulak and drove them back to Rowanduz.

Agha Petros defeated the Turks in Sauj Bulak and drove them back to Rowanduz. He sometimes had limited control over Armenians and other Assyrian forces, and was indeed mistrusted by quite a few of them. There was disunion in the ranks, and instead of posting a force to contain the Turks, whom he had defeated previously, he moved his forces to Sain Kala as encouraged by the British officials, who had promised him military help. Nevertheless, the British did not fulfill their promises. He reached Sain Kala seven days after the British detachment retired.

After the invasion of Mosul by the Young Turks, the Assyrian army, led by General Agha Petros, fought intensively and successfully against the Ottoman army and their Kurdish allies, and pushed them out of Mosul and the whole area, leading to Britain's control of the region. The battles are described in detail by surviving letters of Petros and British officials.

Agha Petros also had some disagreements with Mar Shimun, the patriarch of the Assyrian Church of the East, and was often mistrusted by his family. The Allied military advisors reported that he schemed against Mar Shimun, by trying to dissuade the Allies to trust the Patriarch.
However, after the murder of Mar Shimun by the Iranian Kurdish leader Simko, Agha Petros joined forces with Malik Khoshaba and others in driving Simko from his stronghold at Koynashahr.

Later years 
Petros was the head negotiator for the Assyrians between 1919 and 1923. On July 24, 1923, he took part in the League of Nations Peace Conference in Lausanne, Switzerland, where he approached the Turkish delegation for the resettlement of the Assyrians in and around Hakkâri Province in exchange for the loyalty of the Assyrians. The then secretary/minister of foreign affairs of Turkey, İsmet İnönü who was heading the Turkish delegation at Lausanne was in favor of the resettlement but a telegram received from the central government in Ankara prevented that.

During his last years Petros moved near Toulouse, France, where he lived until his death of a cerebral attack at the railway station, on February 2, 1932.

Controversies 
In his book The Cradle of Mankind, life in Eastern Kurdistan W.A. Wigram mentions that Petros was involved in fraudulent acts in British Columbia (Canada), where he resorted to collecting money purportedly for the building of an orphanage in Macedonia. According to some historians he fled the country as the Canadian police was about to arrest him. He was later to be found in Rome where he passed himself off as an Assyrian tribal chief desirous to bring his tribe from the Assyrian Church of the East over to the fold of the Roman Catholic Church (called " Chaldean Catholic Church "). Impressed and grateful for this decision, the Catholic authorities granted him an official decoration. Petros then returned to the Ottoman Empire and displayed his decoration from the Pope to local authorities to ask for a job at an Ottoman Consulate. A job that he did get, as a secretary, and as a Consul in Urmia in 1909.

Some historians believe Petros Elia was merely concerned by his own ambition. The Allied military advisors reported that he schemed against Mar Shimun, by trying to dissuade the Allies from trusting him. He was also reportedly mistrusted by the Allies. Lieutenant Gasfield and French Surgeon-Major Caujole have recorded his subordinates' low esteem in their reports.

See also
Assyrian people
Assyrian genocide

Notes

References

Zindamagazine Archives
 online version
 
 The Tragedy of the Assyrians By R. S. Stafford online version
Joseph Naayem, Shall this Nation die?, Chaldean Rescue, New York, 1920 online version
 Méthy Daniel, L'action des grandes puissances dans la région d'Ourmia (Iran) et les Assyro-Chaldéens: 1917–1918 in Studia Kurdica n°1–5, Paris,1988, ISSN 0765-1074 online version
آغا بطرس: سنحاريب القرن العشرين, نينوس نيراري

External links
1923: Agha Petros and the Lausanne Telegraphs

1880 births
1932 deaths
People from Hakkari
Ottoman Assyrian politicians
Chaldean Catholics
Ambassadors of the Ottoman Empire
Military leaders of World War I
Assyrian military leaders
Assyrians from the Ottoman Empire